Wesley Drewett Black (November 27, 1910 – January 10, 2000) was an educator and political figure in British Columbia. He represented Nelson-Creston in the Legislative Assembly of British Columbia from 1952 to 1972 as a Social Credit member.

He was born in Vancouver, British Columbia, the son of Daniel James Black and Edith Elizabeth Marshall, and was educated in Vancouver and at the University of British Columbia. In 1938, Black married Helen MacKay. He served in the provincial cabinet as Provincial Secretary, Minister of Municipal Affairs, Minister of Social Welfare, Minister of Highways and Minister of Health. Black was defeated when he ran for reelection in 1972. He died of pneumonia at the Royal Jubilee Hospital in 2000.

References

External links 

1910 births
2000 deaths
British Columbia Social Credit Party MLAs
Deaths from pneumonia in British Columbia
Health ministers of British Columbia
Members of the Executive Council of British Columbia
Politicians from Vancouver
University of British Columbia alumni
20th-century Canadian legislators